8 is the eighth full-length studio album by Indonesian experimental metal band Kekal, announced on 23 June 2010, and made available for purchase on 23 January 2011. While the band has no officially active members, former members Jeff, Leo, and Levi all contributed to the album. The album was set to be released by Whirlwind Records during December 2010, on CD and as a digital download, and on 15 December 2010, the album was available for pre-order, which included an offer of free shipping within Europe up to December 24.

On 19 February 2010, Jeff announced that he had posted a music video on YouTube for a song titled "Tabula Rasa". At that time, the new album was still untitled. On 24 March 2011, it was announced that "Tabula Rasa" was included on a compilation/sampler album by the Sonic Seducer magazine. Metal Hammer Germany commented that the album was far from the early black metal days of the band, and gave the album a rating of 4 out of 7.

Track listing

Personnel
Jeff Arwadi – electric and acoustic guitars, vocals, drums, TR-808, theremin, analog synthesizer, vocoder, samples and field recordings
Azhar Levi Sianturi – album artwork
Leo Setiawan – additional guitar on "Departure Gate 8" and "Heartache Memorial"

Production credits
Jeff Arwadi – assembly, programming, manipulation, arrangements, mixing, mastering
A. Levi Sianturi (a.k.a. Harshgriev) – artwork and illustration
Soundmind Graphics – digital layout

References

External links
 HM Magazine news update. At the time of the article, the album was still untitled

2010 albums
Kekal albums
Post-rock albums